Agonopterix lacteella is a moth in the family Depressariidae. It was described by Aristide Caradja in 1920. It is found in the Russian Far East (south-eastern Siberia).

References

Moths described in 1920
Agonopterix
Moths of Asia